Supranational or supra-national may refer to:

 Supranational union, a type of multinational political union
 Supranational law, a form of international law
 Supranational legislature, a form of international legislature
 Supranational currency, a form of international currency
 Supranational bond, a form of financial asset
 Supranational aspects of international organizations
 List of supranational environmental agencies

See also
 Subnational (disambiguation)
 International (disambiguation)
 Multinational (disambiguation)
 Transnational (disambiguation)
 National (disambiguation)